American singer-songwriter Meghan Trainor has recorded songs for four studio albums, two extended plays (EP), two live albums, three independent albums and guest features. Trainor self-released three albums: Meghan Trainor (2009), I'll Sing with You (2011) and Only 17 (2011).   When she signed with Epic Records in February 2014, her three self-produced albums were pulled from circulation.

Trainor's debut EP, Title, released in September 2014, was preceded by the single "All About That Bass". Musically, the EP has a throwback style sound with its 1950s doo wop-inspired songs straddling the line between modern R&B and melodic pop.  Its lyrics contemplate 21st century womanhood. Her debut major-label studio album Title, released in January 2015, included the singles: "All About That Bass", "Lips Are Movin", "Dear Future Husband" and "Like I'm Gonna Lose You". She collaborated with other artists, including Chris Gelbuda, Jesse Frasure, John Legend and Shy Carter, for the album. Title was inspired by Trainor's love for throwback style records and music from the 1950s and 1960s. She combined different musical genres, including Caribbean, doo-wop, hip hop, soca and pop, for the album. Trainor has appeared as a featured artist on Charlie Puth's song "Marvin Gaye", and has contributed songs to soundtracks: "Better When I'm Dancin'" for The Peanuts Movie, and "I'm a Lady" for Smurfs: The Lost Village.

Trainor's second major-label studio album Thank You, released in May 2016, included the singles: "No", "Me Too" and "Better". She created the R&B album in hopes to showcase her "Caribbean side" and her love for Aretha Franklin, Bruno Mars and Elvis Presley. Trainor released several songs in 2018, including the singles "No Excuses", "Let You Be Right" and "Can't Dance". Later that year, she released "Just Got Paid", a collaboration with Sigala and Ella Eyre featuring French Montana. Trainor and Eyre's vocals on the song received praise from some critics and were dubbed "poppy". Trainor's second EP, The Love Train, released in February 2019, included the single "All the Ways". Trainor's third major-label studio album, Treat Myself, was released in January 2020, followed by her fourth, A Very Trainor Christmas, in October. Takin' It Back, her fifth major-label studio album, was released on October 21, 2022.

Songs

References

External links
Meghan Trainor on AllMusic

Trainor, Meghan